Amor com Amor Se Paga is a Brazilian telenovela produced and displayed at the time of 18 hours by TV Globo, March 19 to September 14, 1984, in 155 chapters. Substitute Voltei pra Você and be succeeded by Livre para Voar.

Written by Ivani Ribeiro, with collaboration of Solange Castro Neves, was inspired by the plot Camomila e bem-me-quer, and was directed by Gonzaga Blota, Atílio Riccó and Jayme Monjardim.

It was one of the most seen novels of the time of the 18 hours of the Globo. Decades after the first showing of the novel, Ary Fontoura claims to be still called his Nonô on the street, because of the great success of the plot.

Cast

References

External links

1984 Brazilian television series debuts
1984 Brazilian television series endings
1984 telenovelas
TV Globo telenovelas
Brazilian telenovelas
Portuguese-language telenovelas